Margi is a village located in the Nicosia District of Cyprus. Before 1960, the village population was made up almost exclusively of Turkish Cypriots.

References

Communities in Nicosia District
Turkish Cypriot villages depopulated after the 1974 Turkish invasion of Cyprus